Budihni is a small settlement on the right bank of the Vipava River southeast of Dornberk in the Municipality of Nova Gorica in western Slovenia.

References

External links

Budihni on Geopedia

Populated places in the City Municipality of Nova Gorica